The national federation was created in 1956 and became a FIFA affiliate in 1956. However women's football is not included in the country's FIFA coordinated Goals! project. By 2011, inside the Saudi Arabia Football Federation, there has been an effort to create women's football programs at universities. Input had been sought on how to do this from other national federations including ones from the United States, Germany, Brazil and the United Kingdom.

In February 20th 2022 the Saudi women team played and won their first ever match against Seychelles 2-0.

History
Founded in 2006, King's United women football club was the first women's football club in Saudi Arabia. In 2009, they trained in Jeddah. The team was initially sponsored by Prince Alwaleed bin Talal but facing scrutiny in the face of intense media coverage, he withdrew his support in 2009. In 2012, the team trained three times a week outside the sight of men, with players wearing traditional football kit of short sleeved shirts and shorts. The team is coached by Reema Abdullah who also is the team's striker. It has 35 players who range in age from 13 to 35. Other women's teams have been created in the country in cities like Riyadh and Dammam and a tournament was held in 2008, with seven teams competing and the event being won by King's United. The first match between two female teams in the country occurred in January 2008 when the Prince Mohammad bin Fahd University team beat Al-Yamamah College in a match played at Dammam's 35,000-spectator capacity Prince Mohamed bin Fahd Stadium in a shootout victory before an all-women audience. The player of the match was Al-Yamamah College's goalkeeper. In March 2009, a women's charity football match was held between a team called "University" and a team called "Barcelona" that was attended by 400 female fans and no men. The game was won 2–1 by University and earned SR81,000 ($21,598) to go towards people with disabilities in the eastern part of the kingdom.

, no data was available for the number of women's football players in the country. In 2006, there was international uproar when Saudi authorities sought to prevent women from attending a game between the Saudi Arabia national football team and the Sweden national football team. In 2008, the situation for women's football in the Middle East was said by author Gary Brecher to be up there in popularity of freedom and democracy in the region. An all-women's school sporting competition was held at Effat University in 2010. The tournament was investigated by Saudi authorities because, according to Ahmed al-Zahrani, director of the Girls Education Department in Jeddah, the country does not have "any regulations that say that it's okay for girl schools to hold sports classes or training". In 2011, women's football was seen as a way to combat a growing problem of obesity in the country.

Football is the most popular sport for Saudi women. However, there is no official football academies, clubs or school leagues. The Saudi women succeeded in creating more than 10 recreational teams across the country, most of the teams are based in the big cities: Riyadh, Jeddah and Khobar.

In December 2020, the Saudi Sports for All Federation launched the first nation-wide football league in three major cities: Dammam, Riyadh, and Jeddah. The champions of each city were Jeddah Eagles, Eastern Flames FC, and Challenge FC.

National team and football league
The Saudi Arabia women's national football team represents the kingdom in international football. However, the team could not exist for long time because of influence of religious leaders in Saudi Arabia,women's sport, and active opposition of political leaders and sport administrators. International pressure has come to bear on the country to field a women's team, and FIFA now allows the hijab to be worn in competition. A meeting at the College of Business Administration in Jeddah was seen as a possible first step in a team eventually being created.

In 2008, due to the influence of conservative religious leaders in the country, the creation of a FIFA recognised women's national team was banned by law.

Growing the game and having an opportunity to have a women's national team has been hindered by the systematic discrimination that all women's sport is subject to in the country. Saudi Arabia's Olympic Committee head Nawaf bin Faisal is quoted as saying that the committee should "not be endorsing any female participation at the moment". In November 2011, Ahmad Eid Al-Harbi, vice president of the Player Status Committee for the Saudi Arabian Football Federation, said of the creation of a women's national team: "Saudi society is a very conservative one, even when it comes to men’s clubs. No one can imagine his daughter playing in front of thousands of people wearing shorts, such as in soccer." Leaders in Saudi Arabian sport held a meeting in mid-2011 at the College of Business Administration in Jeddah where they discussed women's sport and possible participation of women as part of the Saudi Arabia national team at the Olympic Games. They were inspired by the example of seven other Arab nations having successfully created women's national football teams. During 2012 opposition to women's participation in sport softened with the national Olympic Committee and the Saudi Embassy in London announcing that women's participation at the 2012 Summer Olympics would be permitted if they were invited.

No Saudi women's national football team competed at the 2012 London Olympics, despite extensive pressure from the International Olympic Committee. Still, in 2012, the national federation was quietly arguing with the International Football Association Board not to allow women's participation if they were wearing the hijab while playing. The logic they followed was that if FIFA allowed women to wear the hijab in recognised matches, it would be much more difficult for the federation to prevent a national team from being created. There is a lot of pressure being put on the sporting community to allow national representation of women as the kingdom would likely be the only nation in the world to prohibit women from competing at the Olympics. A female football player in the country in 2012 said of the situation as it pertains to the national team: "Our generation started the game, the leagues, the structure. The next generation will have it on a silver platter. We may not get to play for a national team but we're laying the groundwork."

These issues persisted in 2016. Women were prohibited from participating in regional and national championships in football.  The climate is still hostile, with Saudi clerics in 2015 saying, women participating were "steps of the devil”.   Team creation and development was also hampered by the Saudi Arabia national Olympic committee lacking a section for the development of women's sport. Some obstacles for the creation of a national team were removed with women being allowed to represent the country at the Youth Olympics. Female players in the country were optimistic in October 2017 about a team being created in the near future as a result of the Vision 30 plan, which is supported by the King with the goal of increasing women's participation in all parts of Saudi culture including in sports. 2014 was also seen as a year with forward progress as women were allowed to enter stadiums in the country to watch men's football for the first time. However, women entered stadiums for the first time in January 2018. The team still did not officially exist as of June 2019. 

In December 2019, Jeddah Eagles won Jeddah Women's Football League, the first women competition organized by the Saudi Arabia Football Federation. In February 2020, Saudi Arabia decided to launch a football league for women in the whole country.

Eastern Flames Football Club (EFFC) is one of the earliest football teams in Saudi Arabia. It was established in 2006 as a recreational team by Saudi Aramco employees. Since then, the team evolved from being recreational into a competitive team that participates in many leagues and tournaments inside and outside the Kingdom of Saudi Arabia.

In January 2019, EFFC participated in the first women's football tournament in the Gulf Cooperation Council in Al Ain.

In December 2020, EFFC participated in the KSA Women's Football League organized by the Saudi Sports for All Federation and won first place in the Dammam regional league.

In February 2022, the women's national team played their first match against Seychelles in a friendly match, with a 2–0 win over the opponent.

References

Women's sport in Saudi Arabia